is the sixth studio album of Japanese singer and songwriter Miho Komatsu. It was released on 25 September 2003 through Giza Studio label.

Background
The album includes previously 3 released singles, mysterious love, Futari no Negai and Watashi Sagashi.

Hirohito Furui from Garnet Crow was involved with the album production as an arranger.

Her fifth single Chance has received new remix with subtitle Rechance by Hiroshi Asai from The★tambourines.

Some b-side tracks from her previously released singles Watashi Sagashi and mysterious love were included in the album, such as Toori Ame and Tokubetsu ni Naru Hi.

For first time after 5 years, she did self cover of her written songs for Being artist Field of View's Oozora he, Kawaita Sakebi and Deen's Kimi Sae Ireba. Kimi Sae Ireba was included in Deen's compilation albums Deen The Best Kiseki and DEEN The Best FOREVER Complete Singles+.

The singles Futari no Negai and Watashi Sagashi were included in the compilation album Giza Studio Masterpiece Blend 2003.

Charting
The album reached #27 rank first week with 12,207 sold copies. Album charted for 8 weeks and totally sold 17,805 copies.

Track listing

In Media
mysterious love
for Nihon TV variety program TV Ojama Manpou as ending theme
Futari no Negai
for Nihon TV music program AX MUSIC-TV as theme song

References

2003 albums
2003 songs
Miho Komatsu songs
Songs written by Miho Komatsu
Giza Studio albums
Japanese-language albums
Being Inc. albums
Albums produced by Daiko Nagato